The 1997 Grand Prix was a professional snooker tournament and the first of eight WPBSA ranking events in the 1997/1998 season, preceding the UK Championship. It was held from 14 to 26 October 1997 at the Bournemouth International Centre in Bournemouth, England.

Mark Williams was the defending champion, but he lost his last 32 match against Matthew Stevens. Dominic Dale won his first ranking title by defeating John Higgins 9–6 in the final.

Tournament summary 

Defending champion Mark Williams was the number 1 seed with World Champion Ken Doherty seeded 2. The remaining places were allocated to players based on the world rankings.

Main draw

Final

Qualifying
Round of 96  Best of 9 frames

 Michael Judge 5–3 Darren Clarke 

 Matthew Stevens 5–3 Mark Gray 

 Matthew Couch 5–2 Joe Johnson 

 Wayne Jones 5–2 Martin Dziewialtowski 

 Troy Shaw 5–3 Jimmy Michie 

 Paul Hunter 5–2 Gary Ponting 

 Peter McCullagh 5–4 Nick Pearce 

 Drew Henry 5–3 Ian Brumby 

 Bradley Jones 5–2 Shokat Ali 

 John Read 5–3 Dean Reynolds 

 Paul Wykes 5–0 Karl Broughton 

 Euan Henderson 5–1 Sean Storey 

 Stephen O'Connor 5–3 Stefan Mazrocis 

 Craig MacGillivray 5–4 Mark Davis 

 Quinten Hann 5–3 Mark Bennett 

 Leigh Griffin 5–3 Tony Jones 

 Jamie Burnett 5–2 Lee Richardson 

 Gerard Greene 5–4 Joe Perry 

 Dominic Dale 5–1 Karl Burrows 

 Peter Lines 5–0 Tony Chappel 

 Paul Davies 5–2 Marcus Campbell 

 Dennis Taylor 5–2 Jamie Woodman 

 Alfie Burden 5–2 Graeme Dott 

 David Gray 5–4 Dave Finbow 

 Jonathan Birch 5–1 Steve Judd 

 Anthony Davies w/o–w/d Karl Payne 

 Ian McCulloch 5–3 Chris Scanlon 

 Wayne Brown 5–3 Jason Prince 

 Stuart Pettman 5–3 Dene O'Kane 

 David Roe 5–2 John Lardner 

 Jason Ferguson 5–3 Lee Walker 

 Willie Thorne 5–4 Nick Walker

Century breaks

References 

1997
Grand Prix
Grand Prix (snooker)
Grand Prix